The Voice of Industry was a worker-run newspaper published between 1845–1848, at the height of the American Industrial Revolution. The Voice was centrally concerned with the dramatic social changes wrought by the Industrial Revolution, as workers came to depend on corporations for a wage.

The Voice, a small four-page newspaper, started publication on May 29, 1845 in Fitchburg, Massachusetts under the auspices of the New England Workingmen's Association, with the young mechanic William F. Young at the helm. While primarily concerned with land and labor reform, the paper addressed a number of other social issues, including war, education, women's rights, religion, slavery, and prison reform. All of the writing was done by the "workingmen and women," who, Young wrote in his inaugural editorial, "can wield the pen with as much perfection as the instruments of their respective vocations," and to whom he extended "a hearty welcome ... whether they agree with us on all points or not."

Shortly after it was established, the paper moved from Fitchburg to Lowell, where it was adopted by the first union of working women in the United States, the Lowell Female Labor Reform Association led by the young labor leader Sarah Bagley.

Criticism of the Industrial Revolution 
Workers writing in the Voice were sharply critical of the character and effects of the Industrial Revolution. Their concerns mirrored those of the broader American labor movement in the 1840s, a period in which worker unrest was directed towards the loss of status and economic independence experienced under the new economic system. It was, as the historian Norman Ware noted, "this social revolution that primarily affected the industrial worker in this period, and against which his protests were made." At the center of this revolution was a dramatic loss of control over economic life, as workers were made to sell their labor for a wage. This new dependence was, they argued, the natural result of an economic system driven by an imperative to accumulate wealth. It was this acquisitive, selfish drive that was the target of many workers in the 1840s who opposed the new economic order.

Accordingly, criticism in the Voice spanned a broad range. Workers denounced the new ethic of accumulation itself, seeing it as both immoral and destructive of the benevolent parts of human nature. They expressed alarm at how the profit motive directed technological change, as new 'labor-saving' machinery that might have been used to reduce toil was instead deployed to increase output. They protested the new ways of organizing work, which, in the name of maximizing profit, was divided into confined, repetitive tasks that diminished their capacity for self-development. They were dismayed by how economic power infected the political system, resulting in dubious and expensive wars, and making labor reform efforts difficult. And all of this, of course, in addition the harsh disciplinary power wielded by the corporations directly, which worsened their position amidst unprecedented corporate prosperity.

Loss of status and independence 
The overarching theme of worker protests during the 1840s was, as Norman Ware has observed, the loss status and independence that took place as "sovereignty in economic affairs passed from the community as a whole into the keeping of a specialized class". Ware notes that this shift was symbolized by the changing terms of the labor contract, in which the term "price" was displaced with "wage", as work was divorced from social life and offered as a commodity for sale:

The old term for the remuneration of the mechanic was 'price'. It referred to his product rather than to his labor, for it was his product that he sold. When the producer, whether master or journeyman, sold his product, he retained his person. But when he came to sell his labor, he sold himself. The term 'wage' that displaced 'price' as the Industrial Revolution advanced had formerly applied only to day labor, and the extension of the term to the skilled worker was regarded by him as a symbol of a deeper change.

Significantly, many workers in the 1840s saw their new, dependant status as opposed to American ideals of freedom and equality. This was especially true of the women writing in the Voice, many of whom were granddaughters of American revolutionaries, and self-identified as "Daughters of Freemen." These women, the historian Thomas Dublin observes, felt "no deference toward their employers," expressing the conviction that they "were the social equals of their overseers, indeed of the millowners themselves." This sense of dignity and social equality had played a significant role in the strikes of the previous decade, which were prompted by wage cuts by the mills. In response to one of these cuts in 1834, a petition circulated "to obtain the names of all who imbibe the spirit of our Patriotic Ancestors who preferred privation to bondage," was signed by 800 women, and concluded with the following poem:

Let oppression shrug her shoulders,
And a haughty tyrant frown,
And little upstart Ignorance,
In mockery look down.
Yet I value not these feeble threats
Of Tories in disguise,
While the flag of Independence
O’er our noble nation flies.

This identification with revolutionary republicanism continued into the 1840s. Much of the writing in the Voice, such as this piece advocating for the Ten Hour workday, evokes the rhetoric of the American Revolution:

Are you the sons of those who fought so nobly the battles of freedom? Are you the sons of the fathers of '76? If so, let your voices be heard in thundertones, and your hands be stretched forth to save us from the same evils that threatened us when they declared themselves free from a foreign power.

Selfish individualism as immoral 
Workers were bitterly opposed to the ethic of selfish individualism at the heart of the new economic system. One labor leader, writing in the Voice, denounced this new "Spirit of the Age", the imperative that people "get gain … gain wealth … forgetting all but self."

A society organized on principles of selfish individualism was, a worker in the Voice put it, "at war with the better and higher feelings of man's nature." The emphasis on accumulation was seen by many as corroding the more altruistic and social parts of human nature. "Man is a social being," wrote another worker, "the very nature and the circumstances necessary to the development of his natural capacities proclaim. ... Sympathy," he continued, was "the only true principle" which "rightly associates the human family. But how often is this great principle misruled by the demands of want – or the schemes of vain or pecuniary policies?"

The single-minded pursuit of wealth had equally pernicious effects on the minds of the industrialists who oppressed them. "Business men," wrote one operative, "in the general scramble for more, almost or entirely neglect all faculties of the mind but those directly called into action by their love of gain." This "love and pursuit of riches" not only "choke[s] the mind and dwarfs it," wrote another operative, "but the disease itself is hopelessly beyond remedy."

The profit motive was also seen as in conflict with Christian ideals of benevolence and charity. Many workers voiced intense opposition to an economic system founded on the sin of "avarice," and the "undue exercise of … selfish propensities." The pursuit of wealth, wrote one worker, "make[s] a total wreck of everything noble, generous or philanthropic," making "dollars … the only joyous sounds that strike upon the ear…the only objects of sincere worship." The divorce of religious principles from industrial relations was, in the words of another, "a fatal wrong", which allowed "professed christians to practice injustice in their business, social and political capacities." They were equally critical of fellow workers who worshiped "at the altar of mammon," a Biblical reference to the demon of gluttony and riches.

Disturbed by the rapid spread of this selfish, individualistic ethic, workers looked to the various reform movements of the period, which organized production according to cooperative, rather than competitive, principles.

Technology as biased towards output 
Many workers were alarmed the disconnect between the enormous liberating potential of the new 'labor-saving' machinery, and the way this technology was instead developed and applied, in the name of maximizing profit, to increase output. Machinery, they argued, should be developed with the aim of freeing people from toil, allowing them more time to cultivate and develop their talents."With such gigantically increased means of production," wrote one worker, "would it not be supposed that the Laboring Classes would be rendered more comfortable?" Instead, they watched with dismay as their work increased, and was fragmented into narrow, routine tasks, leaving them physically and mentally debased. "Compared with their employers," wrote a worker in the Voice, "[workers] are as a class sinking day by day into a still deeper degradation." Another observed that while there was now "machinery enough in New England to do the work of five times its present population performed in the old way ... the consequence is we are nearer starvation."

This was not the attack of the caricatured, machine-sabotaging, "luddite." These workers were instead criticizing the definition of "efficiency" under the new economic system, in which "costs" were restricted to monetary expenses, and "benefits" were defined by physical output. Any benefit outside of this narrow calculus—such as whether the work was enjoyable, or was designed to engage workers' intelligence—were not counted as a "gain", and was seen instead as either irrelevant or counterproductive to "profitable" work.

Criticism of the division of labor 
Workers were also critical of the new ways in which factory work was organized, which was often reduced to fragmented, monotonous, and tedious tasks. While this division of labor produced unprecedented increases in productivity and output, workers were weary of its effects on their character, and their capacities for learning and self-development.

Many workers had come to Lowell for its vibrant, working class intellectual culture: they read voraciously in libraries and reading rooms, attended public lectures on topics ranging from astronomy to music, and even pursued literary composition (defying factory rules, some would even fasten verses to their spinning frames, "to train their memories," and pin up mathematical problems in the rooms where they worked).

But they quickly found that this desire and capacity for self-development was incompatible with the long days filled with dreary tasks required by factory work. "Who," asked an operative writing in the Voice, "after thirteen hours of steady application to monotonous work, can sit down and apply her mind to deep and long continued thought? … Where is the opportunity for mental improvement?" A former Lowell operative, looking back on her experience in the mills, expressed a similar view: "After one has worked from ten to fourteen hours at manual labor, it is impossible to study History, Philosophy, or Science," she wrote. "I well remember the chagrin I often felt when attending lectures, to find myself unable to keep awake. ... I am sure few possessed a more ardent desire for knowledge than I did, but such was the effect of the long hour system, that my chief delight was, after the evening meal, to place my aching feet in an easy position, and read a novel."

This sentiment—that repetitive and exhausting work was corrosive to "the expression and cultivation of the intellectual powers"—echoed concerns about the division of labor voiced by Adam Smith from almost a century earlier. In the Wealth of Nations Smith had observed that a worker "whose whole life is spent in performing a few simple operations…has no occasion to exert his understanding…He naturally loses, therefore, the habit of such exertion, and generally becomes as stupid and ignorant as it is possible for a human creature to become." Smith argued that this epidemic of "gross ignorance and stupidity" wrought by the division of labor in civilized societies can be countered by extensive public education.

Worker losses amidst prosperity 
The Voice appeared during a period of unprecedented, explosive growth in the textile industry: between 1840 and 1860, the number of spindles in use went from two million to over five million; bales of cotton used from 300,000 to nearly a million, and the number of workers from 72,000 to nearly 122,000. This tremendous growth translated directly into large profits for the textile corporations. Between 1846 and 1850 the dividends of the "Boston Capitalists," the group of textile companies that founded Lowell, averaged 14% per year. Most corporations recorded similarly high profits during this period.

Workers saw none of these gains. Indeed, most saw their positions decline sharply during the 1840s, as the corporations employed fewer workers to tend more machines at faster speeds, for reduced wages. Not surprisingly, this gave rise to considerable discontent. Writing in the Voice as "one of the vast army of sufferers," a worker protested that while workers now tended "three or four looms, where they used to tend but two," and produced twice as much cloth, "the pay is not increased to them, while the increase to the owners is very great. Is this just?" Another, writing in 1845, observed that while the profits of eleven Lowell mills had doubled from the year before, the workers were being paid 12.5% less. "This is the natural result of the state of things in New England," she concluded, "the more wealth becomes concentrated in a few hands, and the poorer the great mass becomes."

This gap between profits and the condition of workers was partly due to the increase in corporate power during this period. While textile corporations had cut wages twice in the previous decade, their power had been limited, as frustrated workers could leave the factories and return to their nearby rural homes. By the early 1840s, however, many New England farms had been lost to a severe economic depression, leaving workers with no place to find respite from the harsh discipline of factory life. A permanent factory population was established in Lowell, and policies designed to increase worker discipline were suddenly more effective. Corporations colluded to increase the work week and the number of hours in the workday. They maintained 'blacklists' that prevented discharged workers—fired, in many cases, for trivial reasons—from finding employment at other mills. A "premium system" was adopted in which supervisors were paid bonuses for pushing operatives to produce more.

As a result, by the mid-1840s, workers were spending 11 to 13 hours each day in factories that were often overheated and poorly ventilated, doing dreary, exhausting work. While they often wrote about being treated by mill owners as "living machines," the reality was much worse—unlike their inanimate counterparts, workers were being compelled to produce more by applying discipline and control.

Writing on other issues

On the Mexican–American War 
The Mexican–American War took place between 1846 and 1848 in the wake of the 1845 U.S. annexation of Texas. President James K. Polk, a Tennessee Democrat and expansionist, made the declaration after a military incident in which 16 American soldiers were killed by Mexicans. The location of the incident was used as the justification for the war and was highly controversial—although Polk claimed that it took place on American soil, this was famously challenged by a newly elected senator from Illinois, Abraham Lincoln. Although many major newspapers that expressed strong views on the need for war also reported broad public support for it, the real extent of popular support remains unclear. There were a number of well-known dissenting voices: A handful of anti-slavery Congressmen who voted against the war, including John Quincy Adams, condemned it as a way to extend the slavery system throughout Mexico (the American Anti-Slavery Society was opposed the same grounds). Henry David Thoreau and Ralph Waldo Emerson were also outspoken critics.

Articles published in the Voice vigorously condemned the conflict. Writers were critical of the motivations for the war, of the role played by fear and patriotism in rallying the public, the disproportionate burdens of war on the working classes, and the massive amount of money spent on the war, which might have been otherwise been used to help the poor. "Give me the money that has been spent in the war," wrote one worker, "and I will clothe every man, woman and child in an attire that Kings and Queens might be proud of. ... I will supply that schoolhouse with a competent teacher," continuing, "I will crown every hill with a church, consecrated with the promulgation of the gospel of peace."

On slavery 
The majority of women operatives fighting for labor reform in the 1840s also stood against slavery, denouncing it the many letters, articles and poetry in Voice; indeed, the women of Lowell became known as the "Pretty Friends of the Slave", and the Lowell Female Labor Reform Association participated officially in several antislavery meetings.

Debate about the Lowell Offering 
Once in Lowell, the Voice continued to advocate for land and labor reform, and was particularly vocal in its support of the emerging movement for the Ten Hour Workday. This focus, and the paper's often militant tone, stood in sharp contrast with another, more famous publication, the Lowell Offering, a monthly literary magazine that was also written, edited, and published by working women in Lowell. The Offering, initially organized in 1840 by the Reverend Abel Charles Thomas (1807–1880), was established to publish pieces written by women in the local "improvement circles" and literary societies organized by the First Universalist Church. In 1842, an operative named Harriet Farley, who had come to work in the mills in 1838 and who had contributed articles to the Offering, became its co-editor.

The Offering painted a sanguine picture of life in the mills. The disconnect between these rosy images and the ever-worsening, dismal reality of factory life alarmed many operatives, including Sarah Bagely, a young operative who had moved to Lowell in 1836 to work in the mills. Bagely, who had joined one of the Lowell improvement circles and had written several articles for the Offering, began submitting articles critical of the factories. Many of these were denied. In a fiery public speech, a frustrated Bagley rebuked the Offering at a convention of the New England Workingmen Association in Worburn, Massachusetts on July 4, 1845, for its deference to the mill owners.

Bagley's speech and following articles in the Voice of Industry set off a heated, public debate between Bagley and Farley. Farley responded in the pages of the Lowell Courier, stating that if any critical articles were rejected, it was not done under her tenure. Bagley replied by calling for Farley to cite a single article published in the Lowell Offering that was critical of the corporations. Farley refused, which prompted Bagley to accuse of her of being a "mouth piece of the corporations." Indeed, writing in the pages of the Lowell Offering early in her tenure, Farley had been clear about her refusal to be drawn into any "controversies" over the conditions in the mills: "With wages and board," she wrote, "we have nothing to do. These depend on circumstances over which we have no control."

The Lowell Female Labor Reform Association 
The Lowell Female Labor Reform Association was started by Sarah Bagley and twelve other women in January 1845. Its membership grew to 500 within six months, and continued to expand rapidly. The Association was managed completely by working women: they elected their own officers with Bagley as president and held their own meetings; they organized the Lowell's female workers, and helped establish similar association in other New England mill towns. They organized fairs, parties, and social gatherings. This labor reform association found considerable support from the workingmen's associations, who welcomed them into their reform organizations and advocated for their treatment as equals.

Shortly after it moved to Lowell, the Voice, under Bagley's leadership, entreated female operatives in Lowell and other factory towns to use the paper as an instrument of their own emancipation, with a notice on November 7, 1845:

"We cordially invite the Factory Girls of Lowell, and the operatives and working people generally, whether they agree with us or not, to make the Voice a medium of communication; for it is your paper, through which you should be heard and command attention. The Press has been too long monopolized by the capitalist non-producers, party demagogues and speculators, to the exclusion of the people, whose rights are as dear and valid."

To this end, the Lowell Female Labor Reform Association under the direction of Bagley, established a "Female Department" within the Voice, which featured articles and poetry on a variety of subjects of interest to women. The LFLRA also published a series of pamphlets called Factory Tracts, which documented the deteriorating conditions in the mills, and provided, "a true exposition of the Factory system and its effects upon the health and happiness of the operatives."

In May 1846, the LFLRA bought the type and presses for the struggling Voice, and Bagley briefly assumed the editorial chair. A month later, a new editor was selected and Bagley was fired.

Support for the Ten Hour Movement 
The struggle for the ten-hour day, more than any other issue, was the focal point for many workers organizations in the 1840s. By 1845, factory workers in Lowell were spending between 11 and 13 hours per day performing exhausting work in onerous conditions. It was recognized that in order to succeed, the Ten Hour Movement would require legislative action, which made government and the political process part of labor reform discussions for the first time. Accordingly, working men and women workers organized several petition campaigns demanding laws that limited the workday.

The Voice was at the forefront of many of these efforts. In 1845, the paper spearheaded a vigorous campaign that collected over 2,000 signatures, mostly from women. This led to the creation of the Massachusetts Legislative Committee (the "Investigation of Laboring Conditions"), the first such committee in the United States. The committee was chaired by William Schouler, a state representative of Lowell, an appointment that dismayed many of the activists who had run the campaign. As the editor of a factory-friendly newspaper called the "Lowell Courier," Schouler was perceived as being biased in favor of the corporations (his newspaper was often described by the Voice as a "political organ of the corporations.")

The committee heard testimony from a number of Lowell female workers who spoke about the need for additional time for meals and shorter hours. The Committee Report amounted to an exoneration of the corporations. A law restricting the workday, the committee wrote, would negatively affect the competitiveness of the mills. It would also affect "the question of wages," which the committee held should be set by the market, as negotiated between labor and capital. In Lowell, the committee said, "labor is on an equality with capital, and indeed controls it…Labor is intelligent enough to make its own bargains, and look out for its own interests without any interference from us." The committee concluded by expressing confidence that any abuses in the mills would remedy themselves, through "the progressive improvement in art and science, in a higher appreciation of man's destiny."

The Voice reacted sharply to the report, charging that the political process had been hijacked by the corporations, and accused the committee of distorting the workers' testimony. When Schouler sought re-election following the release of the report, the Female Labor Reform Association vigorously campaigned against him, possibly contributing to his defeat.

Publication history 
--- On May 29, 1845, the Voice, a small four-page newspaper, began publication in Fitchburg, Massachusetts under the auspices of the New England Workingmen's Association, with young mechanic William F. Young as editor. Shortly thereafter, the newspaper moved to Lowell, Massachusetts.

--- In May 1846, the type and presses of the struggling Voice were purchased by the Lowell Female Labor Reform Association under the leadership of Sarah Bagley.

--- In early 1847, the circulation further declined under the editorship of Associationist reformer John Allen, as the paper began to focus exclusively on the associationist movement. The paper's original editor, William F. Young returned briefly in an attempt to increase circulation, but his efforts failed and the paper ceased publication in 1847.

--- In October 1847, the Voice was resurrected as An Organ of the People, edited by D.H. Jaques, with a focus on Cooperative reform movements.

--- In December 1847, the An Organ of the People moved to Boston, where it advocated for Land Reform, before again becoming insolvent on April 14, 1848 (a shortfall of $350 stilled the presses).

--- From June to August 1849, its final incarnation was as The New Era of Industry.

References

External links 
 Lowell Mill Girl Letters University of Massachusetts Lowell, Center for Lowell History
 Mill Life in Lowell Website University of Massachusetts Lowell, Center for Lowell History
 The Lowell Offering University of Massachusetts Lowell, Center for Lowell History
 The Voice of Industry

Defunct newspapers published in Massachusetts